The 1981 United States elections were off-year elections were held on Tuesday, November 3, 1981, comprising 2 gubernatorial races, 5 congressional special elections, and a plethora of other local elections across the United States. No Senate special elections were held.

Federal elections

United States House of Representatives special elections
In 1981, five special elections were held to fill vacancies to the 97th United States Congress.

State and local elections
Several statewide elections were held this year, most notably the gubernatorial elections in two U.S. States.

Gubernatorial elections

Two gubernatorial elections were held in 1981 in New Jersey and the Commonwealth of Virginia and both states flipped parties.

Note: Candidates' vote percentages are rounded to the nearest tenth of one percent. Candidates earning 0.05% or more of the vote are included.

Legislative
Elections took place in the New Jersey Senate and Virginia House of Delegates. The Democrats maintained control of the New Jersey Senate but lost 2 seats. In Virginia, Democrats maintained control of the House of Delegates but lost 8 seats.

References

 General
1981
1981 in the United States